Oleksiy Oleksiyovych Khakhlyov (born 6 February 1999) is a Ukrainian professional footballer who plays as a central midfielder for Zorya Luhansk.

Career
In 2017, Khakhlyov signed for Spanish La Liga side Deportivo Alavés from the youth academy of Dynamo Kyiv, Ukraine's most successful club. In 2019, he was sent on loan to Club San Ignacio in the Spanish fourth division. For the second half of 2019/20, he signed for Ukrainian team Karpaty Lviv. In 2020, Khakhlyov signed for Mynai in Ukraine. In January 2023 his contract with the club was ended.

In January 2023 he signed for Zorya Luhansk.

References

External links
 
 
 

1999 births
Living people
People from Ostroh
Ukrainian footballers
Ukraine youth international footballers
Association football midfielders
Deportivo Alavés B players
FC Karpaty Lviv players
FC Mynai players
FC Zorya Luhansk players
Ukrainian Premier League players
Tercera División players
Ukrainian expatriate footballers
Expatriate footballers in Spain
Ukrainian expatriate sportspeople in Spain
Sportspeople from Rivne Oblast